Ittenheim is a commune in the Bas-Rhin department in Grand Est in north-eastern France.

Geography
Ittenheim is positioned ten kilometres (six miles) to the west of Strasbourg.   The little town is crossed by the departmental road RD1004 (formerly Route Nationale 4):  before the development of the autoroute network, Ittenheim was the first village passed through by motorists after leaving Strasbourg en route for Paris.

Adjacent communes are Hurtigheim to the north and Handschuheim to the west.

Celebrity connection
One of the inhabitants of Ittenheim may have saved the life of President Jacques Chirac during the 2002 Bastille Day parade. Chirac was targeted by a right-wing extremist gunman named Maxime Brunerie: the man who disarmed the gunman, thereby thwarting a presidential assassination, is called Jacques Weber.

See also
 Communes of the Bas-Rhin department
 Kochersberg

References

Communes of Bas-Rhin
Bas-Rhin communes articles needing translation from French Wikipedia